Callias was an Ancient Greek statesman, soldier and diplomat, active in 5th century BC. He is commonly known as Callias II to distinguish him from his grandfather, Callias I, and from his grandson, Callias III, who apparently squandered the family's fortune.

Born to the wealthy Athenian family which provided slaves to the state-owned silver mine of Laurion, he was one of the richest men in Athens. Callias fought at the Battle of Marathon (490) in priestly attire. Plutarch relates that after the battle, an enemy soldier confused Callias for a king and showed him where a large quantity of gold had been hidden in a ditch. Callias is said to have killed the man and secretly taken the treasure, though afterward rumor spread of the incident and comic poets gave his family the name Laccopluti, or "enriched by the ditch." His son, Hipponicus, was a military commander.

Around the time of the death of Miltiades, Callias offered to pay the debt Cimon had inherited from his father in exchange for Cimon's sister Elpinice's hand in marriage and Cimon agreed.

A supporter of Pericles, who was the effective leader of  Athens during this period, Callias took on the role of  diplomat and ambassador for Athens and the Delian League. In about 461 BC he made at least one journey as ambassador to the Persian king Artaxerxes I.

Some time after the death of Cimon, probably about 449 BC  he went to Susa to conclude with Artaxerxes I a treaty of peace which became known as the Peace of Callias.  This treaty  ended the Greco-Persian War and safeguarded the Greek city-states in Asia Minor from Persian attacks. Callias may  also been responsible for peace treaties with Rhegion and Leontinoi, as well as the later peace treaty with Sparta known as the Thirty Years' Peace.

Callias' fate upon his return to Athens remains a mystery and information about his later years remain only fragmentary. According to Demosthenes, he was fined fifty talents on his return to Athens. Others claim, that the Athenians dedicated an altar of peace and voted special honours to Callias.

Callias' son Hipponicus was also a notable military leader, and was to become known as the "richest man in Greece".

Notes

References 
Herodotus vii. 151; Diodorus Siculus xii. 4; Demosthenes, De Falsa Legatione, p. 428; Grote recognizes the treaty as a historical fact, History of Greece, ch. xlv, while Curtius, bk. iii. ch. ii, denies the conclusion of any formal treaty; see also Ed. Meyer, Forschungen., ii.; JB Bury in Hermathena, xxiv (1898).

Battle of Marathon
Ambassadors in Greek Antiquity
5th-century BC Athenians
Athenians of the Greco-Persian Wars
5th-century BC diplomats